Accumulated other comprehensive income
 Allen-Oakwood Correctional Institution, a prison in Ohio
 Anglican Orthodox Church International
 Airports Operators Council International, the American regional office of Airports Council International (ACI).